A nicotini is any alcoholic drink which includes nicotine as an ingredient. Its name is modeled after the word "martini" in the fashion of such drinks as the appletini.

Use
In places which ban smoking, use of the nicotini provides those addicted to nicotine with the opportunity to manage cravings without stepping outside to smoke.

Nicotinis can be used to substitute other alcoholic drinks with stimulants such as caffeinated alcoholic drinks, or coca wine.

Ingredients
Nicotine replacement therapy products may be used to add a verified quantity of nicotine to produce a nicotini.

Risks

Tobacco infused nicotini
Nicotine poisoning may occur from homemade tobacco infused drinks due to varying quantity of nicotine.

Sources
Word Spy: "Nicotini" Last accessed April 8, 2007.
Downs, Maggie. "Smoking Ban? Drink to That with a Nicotini." ''The Cincinnati Enquirer, July 16, 2004. Last accessed April 8, 2007.

External links
Full Speed: "Is the Nicotini the answer?"

Drink mixers
Mixed drinks
Polysubstance alcoholic drinks